Hypotrix rubra is a moth of the family Noctuidae. It is found from south-western New Mexico and south-eastern Arizona southward to the State of Durango in northern Mexico.

The length of the forewings is 12–16 mm.

The habitat consists of ponderosa pine forests and mixed woodlands of pine and oak.

Adults are on wing in early May and early July.

Etymology
Rubra is taken from the Latin for red and refers to the reddish color of the forewings and body of the moth.

External links
A revision of the genus Hypotrix Guenée in North America with descriptions of four new species and a new genus (Lepidoptera, Noctuidae, Noctuinae, Eriopygini)
Images

Hypotrix
Moths described in 2010